Stalheimsfossen is a waterfall located in the village of Stalheim in Voss Municipality in Vestland county, Norway. The famous Stalheim Hotel lies just a short distance from the falls. The river Stalheimselvi is funneled through a small opening in a cliff before flowing out over the falls, into a bowl-shaped gorge at the bottom, ejecting a large spray of water at the bottom.

See also
List of waterfalls#Norway

References

Voss
Waterfalls of Vestland